A collar also known as collar of an order is an ornate chain, often made of gold and enamel, and set with precious stones, which is worn about the neck as a symbol of membership in various chivalric orders. It is a particular form of the livery collar, the grandest form of the widespread phenomenon of livery in the Middle Ages and Early Modern Period. Orders which have several grades often reserve the collar for the highest grade (usually called the Grand Cross). The links of the chain are usually composed of symbols of the order, and the badge (also called "decoration", "cross" or "jewel") of the order normally hangs down in front. Sometimes the badge is referred to by what is depicted on it; for instance, the badge that hangs from the chain of the Order of the Garter is referred to as "the George".

History

A medieval tradition: the Order of the Collar (14th century) 

The first of the Orders of Knighthood were the military orders of crusaders who used red, green or black crosses of velvet on their mantles, to distinguish their brotherhoods. Later the members of knightly orders used rings, embroidered dragons and even garters as the symbol of their order. In the late Middle Ages the knights wore their insignia ever more prominently and medaillons, crosses and jewels in the shape of animals began to be worn on chains around the neck, known as livery collars.  

In the fourteenth century, Amadeus VI, Count of Savoy (1343-1383) instituted the Order of the Collar. The order was dedicated to the Blessed Virgin Mary  The primary and oldest insignia of the order is its collar. It consists of a solid gold medallion of the collar, which portrays the Annunciation of the Blessed Virgin Mary by the Archangel Gabriel. The medallion is surrounded by three intertwined Savoyan knots, decorated with small crosses fleury, and in the upper center, between two of the Savoyan knots, a cluster of rays with a dove, representing the Holy Spirit, is depicted also in gold.  

Animated by a similar Marian devotion, the fashion of these collars spread at the same time as the fashion of wearing rosaries as necklaces spread across Europe reaching England in the fifteenth century.

The Collar of the Golden Fleece (15th tradition) 
Collars of various devices are worn by the knights of some of the European orders of knighthood. The custom was begun by Philip III, Duke of Burgundy, who gave his Knights of the Golden Fleece badges depicting a golden fleece: it was composed of "gold filigree plaques, simulated black and white enamel firestones, and golden fleece pendant".

A French connection: the collar of Saint Michael created in 1469 

Following this new fashion, Louis XI of France, when instituting his Order of St. Michael in 1469, gave the knights collars composed of scallop shells linked on a chain, most famously honouring Raoul de Lannoy after the siege of Quesnoy. The chain was doubled by Charles VIII. The first official portrait of a King of France wearing the collar of the order was that of King Louis XII in 1514 and since then, all other Kings have followed that tradition until the order lapsed in 1830; the Order of Liberation claimed to be its continuation in 1945 and it had its own grand collar made by master goldsmith Gilbert Poillerat, which President Charles de Gaulle wore on his official portrait, preferring its Cross of Lorraine to the symbols attached to the Grand Collier of the Legion of Honour. 

While the order of Saint Michael was exclusively male, Queen Anne of Austria with the help of her chaplain French Dominican friar François Arnoul established the Order of the Celestial Collar of the Sacred Rosary in 1647, proving once again the connection between the collar and the rosary as an instrument of devotion. The statues of the new order were associated to instructions for fifty devout maidens and all virtuous souls, in order to renew Marian devotion and encourage the holiness of women active in the Catholic Church in France.

A tradition spreading to England: Henry VIII and the collar of the Garter (16th century) 

Until the reign of Henry VIII, the Order of the Garter, like most ancient of the great knightly orders, had no collar. But the Tudor king wished to match the continental sovereigns in all things as described in the statues signed on January 5, 1508, by the Register of the Order, and sent to the Holy Roman Emperor Maximilian. The present collar of the Garter knights, with its golden knots and its buckled garters enclosing white roses set on red roses, has its origin in the Tudor age. In 1672, British antiquary Elias Ashmole, described a change from the original collar worn prescribed by King Henry VIII for the collar of the Order of the Garter said to be  "a gold collar, coupled together by several pieces of links in fashion of garters, with a vermillion rose, and the image of Saint George hung thereat". Most of the British orders of knighthood now have collars and they are still worn on special occasions, known as collar days. The Distinguished Service Order, the Order of Merit, the Order of the Companions of Honour and the Imperial Service Order are the exceptions.

Heyday of Grand collars in the 18th century 
After the 17th century the heyday of the collar was over. They were worn only on ceremonial occasions and replaced in daily life by stars pinned to the breast, and badges suspended from ribbons. Many orders retained their collars and when orders were divided into several ranks or grades the collar was usually reserved for the highest rank. The notable exception is Portugal.

At the end of the 18th century most of the European orders had only one rank; that of Knight and although they usually had collars, the cross or badge was now worn on a ribbon around the neck or over the right shoulder. When the orders became more democratic several ranks were introduced and only the highest grade, the "Grand Commanders" or "Grand Crosses", wore collars. The Netherlands never had collars but several Belgian, most of the Austrian and Prussian orders, and several Portuguese orders had collars. In Portugal all the members of these orders of knighthood wear a collar but the collars of the Grand Cross are more elaborate.

The Grand Collier de la Légion d'Honneur 
Since the beginning of the 19th century, the collar has been used as the insignia of office of the Grand Master of the order.  Napoleon I introduced the Grand aigle (Grand Eagle) to replace the Grand Cross as the highest rank in his Legion of Honour. Napoleon dispensed 15 such golden collars of the Legion among his kinsmen and the highest of his ministers. This collar did not survive his downfall and was abolished in 1815. He also introduced the Grand Collier de la Légion d'Honneur which was the first Grand Collar worn outside of a religious order. The President of France wears the collar of the Order of the Legion of Honour. Nowadays, the collar is often a rank above that of a Grand Cross and it is reserved for the president and foreign heads of state as it is in Brazil.

Heraldry
In heraldry, most members of orders are permitted to display the collar of their order on their coat of arms (if they are in fact entitled to wear the collar). There are often very strict rules as to how exactly the collar is to be displayed. Normally it will entirely encircle the escutcheon (shield), or the collar may be partially hidden by it. Sometimes, only a part of the collar and the badge will extend below the escutcheon.

Collars of different orders are often depicted in the heraldic achievement of various monarchs, encircling the escutcheon. Though the standard achievement used most often may depict specific collars, this does not preclude the use of or substitution with other collars to which someone may be entitled to. Some achievements depict multiple collars while others depict only one; The coat of arms of the Norwegian monarch only depicts the collar of the Order of St. Olav encircling the shield while that of Denmark's depicts the collars of the nation's two chivalric orders: the Order of the Elephant and the Order of Dannebrog. In the greater arms of Sweden, the collar of the Order of Seraphim is used. The collar of the Order of Leopold is also depicted in the national arms of Belgium.

Death of a recipient
When a member of an order dies, they are not usually buried with the collar, but it may be displayed on a pillow placed on the coffin (along with other decorations that the member may have) during the funeral. Many orders require that after the death of a member of the order, the collar and perhaps other insignia be returned to the issuing authority. Often, the requirement is that a male relative personally return the award to the order.

Orders with Collar as a separate (highest) rank
Many orders also do have a chain as an ornament that is worn at more official ceremonial occasions (worn by knights of a single class order or members of the highest class of a multi-class order). However, in some orders Collar is a separate rank above that of Grand Cross, i.e.:

Europe 
 : Collar of the Order of Charlemagne
 :
 House of Saxe-Coburg and Gotha: Grand and Lesser Chain of the Order of St. Alexander
 : First Class with Collar of the Order of the White Lion (Recipients)
 : Grand Collar of the Order of Makarios III
 : Collar of the Order of the Cross of Terra Mariana (Recipients)
 : Collar of the Order of the White Star
 : Grand Cross with Collar of the Order of the White Rose
 :
 House of Bagrationi: Knight of the Grand Collar of the Order of the Eagle of Georgia
 :
 House of Wittelsbach: Knight Grand Cross with Collar of the Order of Saint Hubert
 House of Hanover: Knight Grand Cross with Collar of the Order of Henry the Lion
 :
 House of Glücksburg: Collar of the Order of Saints George and Constantine
 : Knight of the Collar of the Equestrian Order of the Holy Sepulchre of Jerusalem
 : Knight with the Collar of the Order of Pius IX
  : Hungarian Corvin Chain
  : Grand Cross with Chain of the Order of Merit of the Republic of Hungary, Civilian Class (Recipients)
 : Collar with Grand Cross Breast Star of the Order of the Falcon *
 : Knight Grand Cross with Collar of the Order of Merit of the Italian Republic (Recipients)
  House of Bourbon-Two Sicilies /  House of Bourbon-Parma: Bailiff Knight Grand Cross with Collar of the Sacred Military Constantinian Order of Saint George
 : Collar of the Order pro Merito Melitensi
  : Commander Grand Cross with Chain of the Order of Three Stars
 : Golden Chain of the Order of Vytautas the Great (Recipients)
 : Grand Cross with Collar of the Royal Norwegian Order of St. Olav
 : Grand Collar of the Order of the Tower and Sword
 : Grand Collar of the Military Order of Christ
 : Grand Collar of the Military Order of Aviz
 : Grand Collar of the Order of Saint James of the Sword (Recipients)
 : Grand Collar of the Order of Prince Henry (Recipients)
 : Grand Collar of the Order of Liberty (Recipients)
 : Grand Collar of the Order of Camões
  House of Braganza: Grand Collar of the Order of Saint Michael of the Wing
  House of Braganza:  Grand Collar of the Order of Merit of the Portuguese Royal House
 : Collar of the Order of the Star of Romania
 : Collar of the Order of the Republic of Serbia
  House of Karađorđević: Knight Grand Collar of the Order of St. Prince Lazar
 : Knight/Dame of the Collar of the Order of Charles III
 : Knight/Dame of the Collar of the Order of Civil Merit (Recipients)
 : Knight/Dame of the Collar of the Order of Isabella the Catholic (Recipients)
 : Knight/Dame of the Collar of the Civil Order of Alfonso X, the Wise (Recipients)
 : Recipient of the Royal Victorian Chain

America 
 : Knight/Dame Grand Collar of the Order of the Nation
 : Collar of the Order of the Liberator General San Martín (Recipients)

 : Grand Collar of the Order of the Condor of the Andes
 : Grand Collar of the National Order of the Southern Cross
 : Grand Collar of the 
 : Grand Collar of the 
 : Collar of the Order of the Merit of Chile
 : Collar of the Order of Bernardo O'Higgins
 : Grand Collar of the Order of Boyacá
 : Grand Collar of the Order of San Carlos
 : Collar of the Order of Merit of Duarte, Sánchez and Mella
 : Collar of the Order of Christopher Columbus
 : Grand Collar of the National Order of San Lorenzo
 : Grand Collar of the National Order of Merit
 :  Knight/Dame Grand Collar of the Order of Grenada
 : Collar of the Order of the Quetzal
 : Collar of the Order of Antonio José de Irisarri
 : Grand Collar of the 
 : Collar of the Order of the Aztec Eagle
 : Collar of the 
 : Collar of the Order of Manuel Amador Guerrero
 : Grand Collar of the Order of the Sun of Peru
 : Collar of the Order of the Liberator

Africa 
 : Collar of the Order of the Nile
 : Collar of the Order of the Republic
 :
  House of Solomon: Collar of the Order of the Seal of Solomon
  House of Solomon: Collar of the Order of the Queen of Sheba
  House of Solomon: Grand Cross with Collar of the Order of the Holy Trinity
 : Collar of the National Order of the Ivory Coast
 :
  House of Ndahindurwa: Knight Grand Collar of the Royal Order of the Drum
 : Collar of Honour

Asia

Middle East 
 : Collar of the 
 : Collar of the Order of al-Hussein bin Ali
 : Collar of the Order of Mubarak the Great
 : Collar of the Order of Al-Said
 : Grand Collar of the State of Palestine
  : 
  : Collar of the Order of Abdulaziz al Saud
  : Collar of the Order of Zayed

South East & North Asia 
 : Grand Collar of the Order of Timor-Leste
 : Collar of the Order of the Chrysanthemum
 :
  Lao royal family: Grand Cross with Collar of the Order of the Million Elephants and the White Parasol
 : Grand Collar (Maringal na Kuwintas) of the Order of the Golden Heart (Recipients)
 : Grand Collar (Supremo) of the Order of Lakandula (Recipients)
 : Grand Collar (Raja) of the Order of Sikatuna

* indicates that the insignia must be returned upon the death of the recipient
† indicates that the order is now dormant but has not been formally abolished

Gallery

References

See also
 British honours system
 Collar (jewelry)
 Collar day
 Livery collar

Orders of chivalry
Heraldry
Neckwear